Constantin Giurescu (born 16 August 1981) is a Romanian football manager who was most recently in charge of Academica Clinceni. Giurescu is known in Romania for his contribution in the youth sector as the founder, manager and vice-president of Sport Team Bucharest Academy.

References

1981 births
Sportspeople from Bucharest
Living people
Romanian football managers
Liga I managers
LPS HD Clinceni managers